Juan Bautista Avendaño Iglesias (born 29 January 1961) is a former professional tennis player from Spain, best remembered for being Spain Davis Cup team captain along Jordi Arrese and Josep Perlas when Spain won its second Davis Cup title, in 2004.

Career finals

Doubles (1 runner-up)

External links 
 
 
 

1961 births
Living people
People from Gozón
Spanish male tennis players
Tennis players from Asturias